Virpazaria is a genus of gastropods belonging to the family Spelaeodiscidae.

The species of this genus are found in the Balkans.

Species:

Virpazaria adrianae 
Virpazaria alexanderi 
Virpazaria aspectulabeatidis 
Virpazaria backhuysi 
Virpazaria deelemanorum 
Virpazaria gittenbergeri 
Virpazaria kleteckii 
Virpazaria nicoleae 
Virpazaria pageti 
Virpazaria pesici 
Virpazaria ripkeni 
Virpazaria stojaspali

References

Spelaeodiscidae